Friedrich IV or Friedrich IV der Friedfertige was Landgrave of Thuringia (1406–1440).

Friedrich superseded Balthasar (1349–1406) and preceded Friedrich V der Sanftmütige (1440–1445).

See also
Thuringia

Politicians from Thuringia